Anambra International Cargo Airport Umuleri is an international airport in Nigeria. It is situated at Ivite-Umueri in Umuleri, Anambra State.

History
The project to build the airport was officially launched by the Anambra State government on April 11, 2017, with construction finishing three years later. The airport was then inaugurated by Anambra State’s Governor Willie Obiano on October 30, 2017.

On December 2, 2021, the Nigerian Civil Aviation Authority issued the Anambra State Government the authority to open the airport for commercial operations, after which the airport began commercial operations on December 7, 2021. In its first month of operations it had recorded 142 flights carrying a total of 3,865 passengers.

In March 2022, a Ziegler fire truck was delivered to the airport.

Airlines and destinations

References 

Airports in Nigeria
2021 establishments in Nigeria